Allison Joan Ross-Edwards (born 17 October 1952) is an Australian sprinter. She competed in the women's 400 metres at the 1972 Summer Olympics.

References

External links
 

1952 births
Living people
Athletes (track and field) at the 1972 Summer Olympics
Australian female sprinters
Olympic athletes of Australia
Place of birth missing (living people)
Olympic female sprinters